Turtle Dove Shoal is a dangerous shoal about three kilometres wide, located at , in the Indian Ocean about fifty kilometres south of the Houtman Abrolhos, off the coast of Western Australia.

The shoal was first charted on a 1627 map by Hessel Gerritsz, where it was labelled as the "Tortelduyff" rocks. The name is thought to signify that the shoal was first discovered by the ship Tortelduif, which is recorded as having arrived at Batavia, Dutch East Indies on 21 June 1623. It was originally laid down in latitude 29° 11' S, and as a result later voyages failed to locate it. In his 1825 Narrative of a survey of the intertropical and western coasts of Australia, Phillip Parker King suggested that they were merely the southernmost reef of the Houtman Abrolhos. In 1846, John Lort Stokes took the same position: 

Turtle Dove Shoal is featured in the movie Storm Surfers 3D (2012)
A 3D adventure into the world of big wave surfing with Aussie tow-surfing legend Ross Clarke-Jones and two-time World Champion Tom Carroll.

References

Exploration of Western Australia
Houtman Abrolhos